The Nest may refer to:

Arts and entertainment

Films
 The Nest (1927 film), an American silent drama film
 The Nest (1980 film), a Spanish drama film
 The Nest (1988 film), an American science-fiction horror film
 The Nest (2002 film), French action thriller film
 The Nest, a 2014 short film directed by David Cronenberg
 The Nest (2018 film), a Canadian psychological thriller 
 The Nest (2020 film), a period drama written and directed by Sean Durkin
 The Nest (2021 film), an American horror film directed by James Suttles
 Sisters (2015 film), originally titled The Nest

Literature
 The Nest (novel), by Cynthia D'Aprix Sweeney, 2016

Music
 The Nest (album), by Ketil Bjørnstad, 2003
 The Nest, a subscription service of record label Owsla

Television
 The Nest (Australian TV series), a 2008 family life documentary
 The Nest (British TV series), a 2020 drama

Other uses
 The Nest (aviary), in Ixtapaluca, Mexico
 The Nest (political party), in Togo
 The Nest (football ground), the 1908–1935 home ground of Norwich City F.C. in England
 The Nest, common name of Croydon Common Athletic Ground in Selhurst, London, England
 The Nest Club, a 1923–1932 cabaret in Harlem, New York, U.S.

See also

Nest (disambiguation)